Super Farm is a party video game with a farmyard theme developed by Asobo Studio and published by Ignition Entertainment for the PlayStation 2. The game was re-released for Windows 8 in 2013 to commemorate its 10th anniversary.

Story
Centering on a farm's only female, a beautiful, full-figured, blonde-haired prize turkey-hen named Pamela, she had made quite an impact down on Super Farm, but when one day she is snatched away, only to be sold at the local meat factory, starts a hilarious and frantic chase to save her.

Gameplay
Up to 4 players control one of 10 anthropomorphic male animals alongside 6 other unlockable animals; 6 game modes such as co-operative play and team play; every field having a huge range of weaponry and items; and 16 varying locations and 4 hidden bonus levels.

The game features 4 game modes: Collect Mode has players competing to gather items to return to Pamela, Baja Mode consists of checkpoint races, Keep It Mode tasks players with holding on to Pamela's handkerchief for as long as possible, and Frag Mode consists of players knocking out and collecting as many of their competitors' teeth as possible.

References

2003 video games
Europe-exclusive video games
Fictional farms
Party video games
PlayStation 2 games
PlayStation 2-only games
Video games developed in France
Video games scored by Frédéric Motte

Multiplayer and single-player video games
UTV Ignition Games games
Asobo Studio games